Djibril may refer to:

 A form of the given name Gabriel
 Djibril Cissé (born 1981), French footballer
 Lord Djibril, a fictional character in the anime Mobile Suit Gundam SEED Destiny